Telti (Gallurese: Tèlti) is a town and comune in the province of Sassari, northern Sardinia (Italy).

References

1963 establishments in Italy
States and territories established in 1963